Dirt Road Communion is the second studio album by American country music artist Chase Rice. It was released on March 20, 2012 via Dack Janiels Records.

Critical reception
Matt Bjorke of Roughstock rated the album 4 out of 5 stars, saying that "Dirt Road Communion is a diverse, well-crafted modern country album. It showcases Chase Rice as a talented stylist with a conversational, charming singing ability and the ability to connect with both tempo and ballads in a way that makes Chase Rice his own artist and not a carbon copy of anyone else past or present and that, my friends, is a true mark of an artist ready to burst into stardom.".

Commercial performance
In April 2012, the album peaked at number 48 on the Billboard Country Albums chart.

Track listing

Notes 
"How She Rolls" and "Whoa" were removed from digital/streaming platforms and as such are exclusive to the album's physical release.

Personnel
Adapted from Dirt Road Communion liner notes.

Musicians 
Kelly Back – acoustic guitar, electric guitar
Brian Bonds – electric guitar
Steve Brewster – drums
Bob Britt – electric guitar
Steve Bryant – bass guitar
Nick Buda – drums
Chad Carlson – bass guitar, acoustic guitar, electric guitar, background vocals
Perry Coleman – background vocals
Mike Durham – electric guitar
Lindsey Hager – background vocals
Tommy Harden – drums
Dennis Holt – drums
Wayne Killius – drums
Troy Lancaster – electric guitar
Rob McNelley – electric guitar
John Osborne – acoustic guitar
Chase Rice – acoustic guitar, lead vocals
Curt Ryle – acoustic guitar
Mike Severs – electric guitar
Adam Shoenfeld – electric guitar
Gary Smith – Hammond B-3 organ, keyboards, piano
Wanda Vick – banjo, dobro, fiddle, mandolin

Technical 
 Chase Rice — producer (all tracks except 2)
 Brian Kelley — producer (all tracks except 2)
 Jesse Rice — producer (tracks 5-8, 11-12, and 14)
 Chad Carlson — producer (tracks 2 and 9), recording/mixing (track 2)
 A.J. Derrick — recording
 Dave Sally — recording
 Eric Green — recording, mixing, mastering
 Brandon Shattuck — recording
 Andi Mans Photography & Design — photography and design
 Lauren Ledbetter — logo design

Chart performance

References

2012 albums
Chase Rice albums